BooClips is a line of digital books for children on the iPad, Android, PC and Mac.  Created by software company Castle Builders (IL), BooClips feature storylines and characters from movies, TV shows and the Bible.  The company has partnered with several big entertainment companies in order to adapt their content to the BooClips format.  These partnerships have assisted Castle Builders with garnering attention to their products.

Since the release of their first BooClips in April 2011, the digital books have experienced a significant amount of notice.  Within six days of the LazyTown's Dr. Rottenstein BooClips release on April 20, 2011, the app was listed as number one in the iTunes US App Store for Books, and as number two in the iTunes App Store overall. Since then Castle Builders has released several more BooClips, and is continuing to develop more.

About BooClips
The name "BooClips" derives from the two words "books" and "clips."  The idea for these digital books for children is to create a multimedia experience that engages children in reading.  The BooClips interface resembles a book, offering synchronized narration of the text with highlighted words, and a guiding element for marking the place on the page.   BooClips integrate many animations with touch capabilities to all for a variety of actions, including an animated page flip effect.  At the end of every chapter is a movie clip in which readers can view video footage of the material they have just read.

In addition to these features, BooClips offer translation into many different languages and clarification of the text, and even American Sign Language interpretation.  Other features include a 3D mode, an animated magnifying glass, an animated bookmark, and a voice-over function allowing parents to record themselves reading in synchronization with the text.

"Edutainment"
BooClips are designed to be a form of "edutainment," meaning that it utilizes entertaining content to help children learn how to read.  BooClips aim to encourage children's individual abilities and self-reliance, expand their vocabulary, improve their reading comprehension level and skills, and develop their imagination, through the mediums of technology and entertainment.

Partnerships and Releases
BooClips are primarily created and released out of partnerships Castle Builders forms with big entertainment companies to obtain content.  On February 23, 2010, the company was picked up by worldwide merchandising and licensing agent 4Kids Entertainment. However, after 4Kids Entertainment filed for Chapter 11 bankruptcy on April 6, 2011, Castle Builders ended its relationship with them, and afterwards started signing other significant deals.

In October 2010 LazyTown entertainment announced a partnership with Castle Builders to produce eight digital books for children. The first two of this series, LazyTown's Dr. Rottenstein BooClip, and LazyTown's Sportafake BooClip, were released for the iPad in April 2011.

The company's next BooClips collaboration, announced on April 25, 2011, was with DreamWorks Animation on its movie, Kung Fu Panda 2.  This partnership actually ended up being a cross-collaboration with House Foods, which was also promoting the film with its tofu products.  From this cross-promotional strategy Castle Builders created the Kung Fu Panda 2 Interactive Cookbook as an addition to its BooClips line.

The Kung Fu Panda digital cookbook was released in May 2011, in the same time frame as the movie.  The interactive cookbook received numerous reviews from both consumers and techies.  In addition to that, the iPhone version of the app received attention from tech website CNET.

On September 12, 2011 Castle Builders announced its next BooClips collaboration with The Kids Bible Company LLC, and launched The Bible BooClips for the iPad.  It released The Bible BooClips Creation and The Bible BooClips Cain and Abel, featuring stories from the Old Testament.

The following month, on October 6, 2011, came the release of Garfield's BooClips – Garfield's Pet Force for iPad, produced by Castle Builders in collaboration with Paws Incorporated, which based it on the Garfield's Pet Force movie that Paws, Inc. created with The Animation Picture Company and Davis Entertainment.  The Garfield digital books contributed to the visibility of BooClips and Castle Builders, receiving many reviews, and particular attention from The Guardian UK news website.

The BooClips digital store was officially released on December 21, 2011.  It had been its beta form on the BooClips website up until that point.  The store splits up its BooClips offerings according to platform, with three categories for PC/Mac, Android, and iPad/iPhone.  Accessed from a mobile device, it can sense what platform that device is using and point it towards the right BooClips.

Castle Builders' most recent BooClips, the Hello Kitty Interactive Cookbook, was released in the iTunes Store on January 14, 2012.  It has garnered a large amount of attention and reviews from people around the world.  The company plans to further collaborate with Sanrio on two more Hello Kitty BooClips that will also be focused on cooking.  This is the first Hello Kitty digital cookbook of the series, and is currently available only for PC, Mac, iPad and iPhone.

TimeLine of Releases
April 20, 2011 - LazyTown's Dr. Rottenstein BooClip and LazyTown's Sportafake BooClip are released for the iPad

May 2011 – Kung Fu Panda 2 Interactive Cookbook BooClips is released in cross-promotion with the Kung Fu Panda 2 movie and House Foods tofu snacks

September 12, 2011 – The Bible BooClips is launched, both The Bible BooClips Creation and The Bible BooClips Cain and Abel

October 6, 2011 – Garfield's BooClips – Garfield's Pet Force for iPad is released for the iPad, Android, PC, Mac, Nook Color and iBookstore.

December 21, 2011 – BooClips digital books store is officially released.

January 14, 2012 – The first Hello Kitty BooClips, Hello Kitty Interactive Cookbook, is released for iPad/iPhone, PC and Mac

About the Company
Castle Builders is a software company that develops digital apps for children.  They create digital books for children as part of the worldwide "Edutainment" market, which aims to produce entertaining content with educational value for kids.  The company was formed in 2006 by its CEO and software architect Gil Abramovich.  The company is made up of artists, animators, designers and developers.

Castle Builders creates using a software platform called the "Computerized Storybook" that the company developed itself.  The platform grabs raw content from movies, music and written stories for children, and embeds it into a storybook interface.  One of the main points about this platform is its quick integration with content, which can take as little as two days to complete.  Castle Builders owns copyrights to the code and interface of the Computerized Storybook.  In addition to that, as of early 2012, the name "BooClips" was officially trademarked and registered in the United States, and under the ownership of Castle Builders.

References

Ebooks
American children's books
Series of children's books
Software for children
Children's educational video games